Martin Dies Jr. (December 21, 1921 – May 14, 2001) was an American politician and jurist from Texas.

Early life
Dies was the son of Myrtle McAdams and Martin Dies Jr., and the grandson of Martin Dies Sr. He grew up in Orange, Texas, and Washington, D.C., where his father was a congressman. He served in the U.S. Navy during World War II, and then earned a law degree from Southern Methodist University in 1947. He then practiced law with his father.

Political and judicial career
Dies was elected to the Texas Senate in 1958, and served from 1959 through 1967. He was appointed Secretary of State of Texas in 1969, and served until 1971. After his term expired, he was appointed to Texas's Ninth Court of Appeals of Texas, and he served as its chief justice until 1989.

Legacy
Dam B State Park was renamed Martin Dies Jr. State Park in his honor in 1965.

He died on May 14, 2001.

References

1921 births
2001 deaths
Texas state senators
Secretaries of State of Texas
Texas state court judges